Nils Reidar Utsi (22 July 1943 – 1 January 2019) was a Norwegian Sámi actor, stage director and film director.

Biography 
He worked for the theatres Den Nationale Scene in Bergen, Hålogaland Teater, which he also cofounded, and Beaivváš Sámi Našunálateáhter, where he staged his first play, an adaptation of Stones in His Pockets. He co-directed the television series Ante from 1975, and also participated as actor. The series treated the situation of indigenous peoples through the Sami boy "Ante", and was sold to 23 different countries.

Utsi played the character Raste in the 1987 Nils Gaup awarded film Ofelaš (Pathfinder).

Utsi died on 1 January 2019, at the age of 75.

Filmography

References

External links

1943 births
2019 deaths
20th-century Norwegian male actors
Norwegian male stage actors
Norwegian male film actors
Norwegian film directors
Norwegian Sámi people
People from Tana, Norway
Sámi actors